Hebeloma sinuosum is a species of agaric fungus in the family Hymenogastraceae. First described as Agaricus sinuosus by Elias Magnus Fries in 1838, it was later transferred to Hebeloma by Lucien Quélet in 1893. It is native to the United Kingdom.

References

sinuosum
Fungi described in 1838
Fungi of Europe
Taxa named by Elias Magnus Fries